Rafaela de Herrera y Torreynosa (1742–1805) was a Spanish criolla. She is considered a national heroine of Nicaragua, due to her actions in the defense of the Fortress of the Immaculate Conception during the Battle for the Río San Juan de Nicaragua in 1762 against the British forces.

Early life

Rafaela Herrera was born on August 6, 1742 in Cartagena de Indias, in the Viceroyalty of New Granada of the Spanish Empire. She was the illegitimate and only child of Lieutenant Colonel Don José de Herrera y Sotomayor (died 1762) and Felipa Torreynosa. Herrera's birth mother was Felipa Torreynosa, who was reported to be a criolla or possibly a mulatto woman. She was raised in Cartagena by another woman—Doña Maria Felipe de Uriarte—who was widely considered to be her de facto mother.

Herrera's father was a captain of artillery who had been engaged in heavy combat against British forces under the command of Vice Admiral Edward Vernon during the Battle of Cartagena de Indias in 1741. At the time of her birth the following year, he was Commander of the Castillo de San Sebastián del Pastelillo, a fortress on the outskirts of Cartagena de Indias. She was also the granddaughter of Brigadier Don Juan de Herrera y Sotomayor (died 1732), a prominent military engineer of Cartagena de Indias and founder of the Academia Militar de Matemáticas de América (Military Academy of Mathematics of America). Her great-grandfather was Captain General Don José Antonio de Herrera y Sotomayor, who had been Governor of Río de la Plata from 1682-1691.

In raising his daughter, Lieutenant Colonel Herrera had tried to educate her not only in military exercises such as the handling of the cannon, but also in the principles of honor, faith and patriotism. Rafaela and her father left Cartagena in 1753, when the latter was assigned as Commander of the garrison at the Fortress of the Immaculate Conception on the San Juan River in the Province of Nicaragua, in relief of Lieutenant Colonel Don Juan Antonio Alonso de Arce.

The Battle for the Río San Juan de Nicaragua

Because it represented a potential route between the Atlantic and Pacific oceans as well as the possibility of expanding their colonization of Central America beyond the Mosquito Coast, Spanish Nicaragua was a major target for British attacks during the 18th century. In 1762, William Lyttelton, the British governor and commander-in-chief of Jamaica, proposed a naval expedition to Nicaragua. The goal was to sail up the San Juan River to Lake Nicaragua and capture the town of Granada, which would effectively cut Spanish America in half as well as provide potential access to the Pacific Ocean. The first and greatest obstacle to success was to capture the Fortress of the Immaculate Conception.

The conflict began in June 1762, during the administration of interim Governor of Nicaragua Melchor Vidal de Lorca y Villena. Supplied by the British expeditionary force, a group of Miskito Sambu filibusters attacked cocoa plantations in the Valley of Matina. The following month they raided many undefended settlements in Nicaragua, including Jinotega, Acoyapa, Lovigüisca, San Pedro de Lóvago, the mission of Apompuá near Juigalpa and Muy Muy, burning and looting the villages as well as capturing some Spanish prisoners. Many of the people the Miskito captured were sold into slavery in colonial Jamaica.

The combined British and Miskito Sambu expeditionary force headed towards the Fortress of the Immaculate Conception on the San Juan River in July. The attacking force consisted of two thousand men and more than fifty boats, while the soldiers at the fortress numbered only around a hundred. To make matters worse, the invaders threatened the region at a time when the commander of the Fortress of the Immaculate Conception, José Herrera, was mortally ill. As he lay on his deathbed, Rafaela made a solemn oath to her father that she would defend the fortress at the cost of her life if necessary. The elder Herrera died some time between July 15 and July 17, and Lieutenant Don Juan de Aguilar y Santa Cruz assumed temporary command of the garrison.

A few days later, on July 26, 1762, a combined British and Miskito Sambu expeditionary force laid siege to the fortress during what would later be called the Battle for the Río San Juan de Nicaragua. At 4 o’clock that morning, the lookout on duty heard cannon fire from the east, in the direction of an observation post which was located at the junction of the Bartola and San Juan rivers. Shortly thereafter, the invaders captured the observation post and its defenders. The British commander learned from the Spanish prisoners that the fortress was in disarray due to the recent death of its commander. A few hours later, with his fleet anchored in the river, the British commander sent an envoy to demand the unconditional surrender of the fortress in exchange for the avoidance of further hostilities. The second in command of the garrison, a sergeant, was about to grant the request when the 19-year-old Herrera intervened. Seeing what she perceived as the cowardly attitude of the defenders, Herrera chided: "Have you forgotten the duties imposed by military honor? Are you going to allow the enemy to steal this fortress, which is the safeguard of the Province of Nicaragua and of your families?" Driven by her promise to her late father and ancestors and knowing the risk to her honor and virginity with the barbarity of the Miskito Sambu, she strongly opposed the surrender of the fort and insisting that each soldier take his place fighting. She ordered the gates of the fortress to be locked, took the keys and placed sentries.

In response to the rejection of their demands, the British formed a skirmish line, believing that this would be sufficient to achieve the desired effect. Herrera, trained in the handling of weapons, fired one of the cannons and managed to kill the British commander with the third volley of cannon fire. Enraged by the death of their boss, the British hoisted their battle ensign and began a vigorous attack upon the fortress which continued throughout the night. The garrison, energized by Herrera’s heroism, mounted a fierce resistance which inflicted great losses to the British soldiers and their boats. At nightfall, Herrera ordered the troops to throw some sheets soaked with alcohol into the river on floating branches and set on fire. The current dragged the burning material towards the enemy craft. This unexpected action forced the invading British troops to suspend their attack for the rest of the night and retreat to defensive positions. The next day the British tried to besiege the fortress, with little progress and many casualties on their side.

Inspired by Herrera's acts of heroism, Lieutenant Juan de Aguilar, the pro tempore garrison commander, led the defenders to victory in a battle that lasted six days. Herrera handled the cannons of the fortress and the Spanish managed not only to defend the strategic position but also to defeat a much larger and better trained military force. The British finally lifted their siege and retreated on August 3, 1762. They withdrew to the mouth of San Juan River, where their presence impeded the flow of shipping into the Caribbean Sea for some time. Fortunately for the defenders of the fortress, Spain and Britain began peace negotiations (in Fontainebleau on November 3, 1762), which culminated in the Treaty of Paris on February 10, 1763. Cuba and Manila, which had been captured by the British, were returned to Spain and the Spanish ceded Florida to the British.

Later life
Herrera later married Don Pablo Mora, a citizen of Granada. The couple bore five children, of whom two were paralyzed. Her husband died after the birth of their fifth child, and the family lived in poverty in barrio Corinto (a poor neighborhood in Granada) until 1781. On November 11, 1781, King Charles III of Spain issued a royal decree granting Herrera a pension for life as a reward for her heroic actions during the Battle for the Río San Juan de Nicaragua; she received some land and a pension of 600 pesos in payment for her merits.

See also
Women in warfare (1750–1799)
Timeline of women in early modern warfare

References

External links
The Fortress of the Immaculate Conception (in Spanish)
History of the Fortress of the Immaculate Conception (in Spanish)
Visual guide of the Nicaraguan population of El Castillo. (in Spanish)

1742 births
1805 deaths
Military history of Nicaragua
Nicaraguan rebels
Women in 18th-century warfare
19th-century Nicaraguan people
Women in war in South America
Nicaraguan people of Colombian descent